Ralph Harris (January 31, 1921 – December 24, 2008) was a British journalist and Reuters presidential correspondent.  He was Reuters' official White House correspondent for the presidents from Truman until Reagan.

Early life
Harris was born on January 31, 1921, in Manchester, England. He worked for Birkenhead News, a small news agency centered in Liverpool, until he was drafted to be in the Royal Air Force. After his service, he moved to the United States and joined Reuters, a then-small agency with only five staff members.

Reuters
Ralph Harris covered news conferences throughout the Truman, Eisenhower, Kennedy, Johnson, Nixon, Ford, Carter and Reagan administrations for Reuters.  He was Reuters' main reporter during the assassination of John F. Kennedy and the assassination of Lee Harvey Oswald.  Harris reported on the hostilities of the South and their support of Jack Ruby, who had killed Oswald.  Harris was also Reuters' correspondent on whether Concorde would be allowed to land in the U.S. and for the 1968 Thule Air Base B-52 crash.  In 1979, Harris became the first foreign president of the White House Correspondents’ Association. Ralph Harris retired in 1986, after 37 years of working with Reuters.  He was commended by Larry Speakes as "a reporter's reporter... [with] accuracy and speed... facts without fluff" and President Ronald Reagan described him as "a veritable institution among the Fourth Estate in Washington". Harris died on December 24, 2008, due to respiratory failure.

Personal life
Harris married his wife, Ena, in 1944, and they had two children and four grandchildren. Ralph Harris became a US citizen in 1995, after 36 years of living in the United States. Harris was also a member of the National Press Club.

References

Further reading
 
 

Journalists from Manchester
Journalists from Washington, D.C.
1921 births
2008 deaths
Reuters people
British emigrants to the United States